Mount Dom Dom is a mountain in Victoria, Australia 65 km from Melbourne.

Mount Dom Dom was the site of a plane crash involving a Cessna 210 aircraft on 18 June 1974 during stormy weather.

An extensive search was conducted by Victoria police, emergency services (including the SES and CFA) and volunteers (including BSAR) on and around Mount Dom Dom over five days for a hiker who went missing on Sunday 23 March 2008.

The summit of Mount Dom Dom is most easily accessed by following the Dom Dom Road (a vehicle track) from Dom Dom saddle then ascending an ill-defined walking track north from the Dom Dom Road to the summit.

See also

Alpine National Park
List of mountains in Victoria
 List of reduplicated Australian place names

References 

Dom Dom